Aliabad-e Sofla (also Romanized as ‘Alīābād-e Soflá; also known as ‘Alīābād-e Pā’īn) is a village in Qaen Rural District, in the Central District of Qaen County, South Khorasan Province, Iran. At the 2006 census, its population was 175, in 44 families.

References 

Populated places in Qaen County